The men's team épée was one of seven fencing events on the Fencing at the 1928 Summer Olympics programme. It was the fifth appearance of the event. The competition was held from 3 August 1928 to 5 August 1928. 93 fencers from 18 nations competed.

Rosters

Belgium
 Émile Barbier
 Balthazar De Beukelaer
 Charles Delporte
 Charles Debeur
 Léon Tom
 Georges Dambois

Czechoslovakia
 Martin Harden
 Josef Jungmann
 František Kříž
 Jan Tille
 Miroslav Beznoska
 Jan Černohorský

Denmark
 Ivan Osiier
 Jens Berthelsen
 Otto Bærentzen
 Peter Ryefelt
 Johan Praem

Egypt
 Elie Adda
 Joseph Misrahi
 Mohamed Charaoui
 Saul Moyal
 Salvator Cicurel

France
 Georges Buchard
 Gaston Amson
 Émile Cornic
 Bernard Schmetz
 René Barbier

Germany
 Theodor Fischer
 Fritz Gazzera
 Hans Halberstadt
 Fritz Jack

Great Britain
 Charles Biscoe
 Bertie Childs
 David Drury
 Martin Holt

Greece
 Konstantinos Botasis
 Tryfon Triantafyllakos
 Konstantinos Nikolopoulos
 Georgios Ambet
 Konstantinos Bembis

Hungary
 József Rády
 János Hajdú
 Albert Bógathy
 György Piller-Jekelfalussy
 Ottó Hátszeghy

Italy
 Giulio Basletta
 Marcello Bertinetti
 Giancarlo Cornaggia-Medici
 Carlo Agostoni
 Renzo Minoli
 Franco Riccardi

Netherlands
 Leonard Kuypers
 Arie de Jong
 Henri Wijnoldy-Daniëls
 Willem Driebergen
 Alfred Labouchere
 Karel, Jonkheer van den Brandeler

Norway
 Sigurd Akre-Aas
 Raoul Heide
 Frithjof Lorentzen
 Jacob Bergsland

Portugal
 Paulo Leal
 Mário de Noronha
 Jorge de Paiva
 Frederico Paredes
 João Sassetti
 Henrique da Silveira

Romania
 Mihai Savu
 Gheorghe Caranfil
 Răzvan Penescu
 Dan Gheorghiu
 Ion Rudeanu

Spain
 Juan Delgado
 Domingo García
 Diego Díez
 Félix de Pomés
 Fidel González

Sweden
 Nils Hellsten
 Sidney Stranne
 Gunnar Cederschiöld
 Bertil Uggla

Switzerland
 Édouard Fitting
 Henri Jacquet
 Frédéric Fitting
 Eugène Empeyta
 John Albaret
 Paul de Graffenried

United States
 Arthur Lyon
 George Calnan
 Allen Milner
 Harold Rayner
 Henry Breckinridge
 Edward Barnett

Results
Source: Official results; De Wael

Round 1

Each pool was a round-robin (with matches not being held where unnecessary to the overall result).  Bouts were to two touches, and each fencer from one nation had a bout against each from the opponent.  The nation which won the most individual bouts took the team match (with total touches as the tie-breaker if the teams split 8-8).  The top two nations in each pool advanced to the second round.

Round 2

Each pool was a round-robin (with matches not being held where unnecessary to the overall result).  Bouts were to two touches, and each fencer from one nation had a bout against each from the opponent.  The nation which won the most individual bouts took the team match (with total touches as the tie-breaker if the teams split 8-8).  The top two nations in each pool advanced to the second round.

Semifinals

Each pool was a round-robin (with matches not being held where unnecessary to the overall result).  Bouts were to two touches, and each fencer from one nation had a bout against each from the opponent.  The nation which won the most individual bouts took the team match (with total touches as the tie-breaker if the teams split 8-8).  The top two nations in each pool advanced to the second round.

Final

The final was a round-robin.  Bouts were to two touches, and each fencer from one nation had a bout against each from the opponent.  The nation which won the most individual bouts took the team match (with total touches as the tie-breaker if the teams split 8-8).

References

Epee team
Men's events at the 1928 Summer Olympics